The United States Customs District of Salem and Beverly was an administrative area for the collection of import duties on foreign goods that entered the United States by ship at the ports of Salem and Beverly. Established in 1789, it was abolished in 1913. Today the ports of Salem and Beverly are serviced by the Port of Gloucester (located at the Cummings Center in Beverly), which is administered by the Boston Customs District.

History
The District of Salem and Beverly was established in the fifth statute passed by the First Congress in 1789 (ch.5). This act provided for the collection of the duties that had been laid down in the Hamilton Tariff earlier that year. The towns of Salem and Beverly were designated as one port of entry for customs purposes. The towns of Danvers and Ipswich were designated as ports of delivery only. The district extended to all shores and waters within the towns of Ipswich, Beverly, Salem and Danvers. A collector, naval officer and surveyor were appointed to the district to reside at Salem, which was the location of the Customs House for the district. Surveyors were appointed to reside at each of the towns of Beverly and Ipswich. In 1790, Salem was the sixth largest city in the country and a major seaport.

In 1796, the district was reorganised, with Ipswich created as a district in its own right. Through the 19th century, Salem declined as a sea port, being seriously affected by the trade embargo with Great Britain. This fact was reflected in 1865, when the posts of surveyor at Beverly and naval officer at Salem were abolished, leaving the collector and surveyor at Salem as the only appointed officers.

The post of surveyor was abolished ten years later in 1875. A collector remained at Salem Custom House until 1913, when Salem lost its status as a separate district and became a port of entry only.

Nathaniel Hawthorne worked in the Custom House as surveyor for Salem from 1846–1849, and the introduction to his famous novel The Scarlet Letter is set there.

Officers
The positions of collector, naval officer, and surveyor were appointed by the President, subject to confirmation by the Senate. From 1820 onwards, officers were limited to four-year commissions, at the end of which they needed to be reappointed by the President. They could be removed from office at the pleasure of the President. From approximately the 1840s onwards, the various posts were seen as a method of rewarding supporters and punishing those of the opposite view by successive administrations. Often, a change of administration led to a change in the Customs House. Other posts, such as deputy collector, inspectors, weighers, measurers and gaugers were recommended by the collector, pending approval by the Secretary of the Treasury. This led to a certain amount of nepotism.

Collector for the District (1789–1913)

The first collector at the port of Salem following the American Revolution was Warwick Palfray. In 1784 he was succeeded by Joseph Hiller and when the collection of import duties was organised on a federal basis in 1789, Hiller was appointed collector. He had been an officer during the Revolution, as had his successor, William R. Lee. When Lee died in office, he was replaced by another soldier, James Miller. Miller was probably the most notable of the collectors to serve in Salem. He was a hero of the War of 1812, where he was made a general following his actions at the Battle of Lundy's Lane. He was a governor of the Arkansas Territory before being elected to Congress in 1824 for New Hampshire. However, he never took up his seat, being appointed instead collector for Salem. He served as collector for over 24 years, the longest term of any collector, before being replaced by his son.

Collectors in Salem were not removed from office as frequently as the other officers, they generally only being replaced when their commissions expired. Charles Odell was the longest serving collector after 1849, with 12 years and the last collector, David M. Little, served for nearly ten years before the office was abolished in 1913.

Naval Officer for the District (1789–1865)

The naval officer for a customs district operated as an auditor, and kept a separate record of the various transactions in the district. The most notable name associated with this office in Salem was one who never actually took up the post, Associate Supreme Court Justice Joseph Story. In 1803, Story was nominated by President Jefferson and confirmed by the Senate for the post, but he declined the appointment upon being convinced that the role would conflict with his then growing private law practice in Salem.

Surveyor of Salem (1789–1875)

The writer Nathaniel Hawthorne is undoubtedly the most famous name associated with Salem customs, and he served as surveyor from 1846 to 1849. However he was just one of a remarkable seven consecutive surveyors who were removed from the post by the President between 1841 and 1861. Every incoming President, it seems, felt the need to put his own man in the post. One of these removals led to the only time the nomination of a customs officer for Salem was rejected by the Senate.

Edward Palfray had been surveyor in 1841 before being replaced by Stephen Daniels. When Daniels himself was removed two years later Palfray was appointed his successor by President Tyler as a recess appointment. However, when Palfray's name came before the Senate for confirmation, his appointment was rejected by a Senate vote, 12 - 23. George W. Mullet was then nominated by Tyler, but he too was rejected, 16 - 25. Finally, Nehemiah Brown was confirmed. Palfray still held the office during this time though, as recess appointments stay in place until a nomination is confirmed or until the end of the Congressional session, whichever comes first.

Surveyor of Beverly (1789–1865)

The surveyor of Beverly was based in the port of Beverly, separate from the rest of the customs officers in Salem. The longest serving surveyor was the first, Josiah Batchelor, who served for 20 years. The most interesting case was that of Samuel D. Turner. He was appointed surveyor in April 1842, but was removed from the position later that year as he "did not qualify".

Surveyor of Ipswich (1789 - 1796)

The surveyor of Ipswich was part of the Salem and Beverly district until 1796, when Ipswich was created as a district in its own right.

Notes

References 

United States Customs Service